For Girls Who Grow Plump in the Night is the fifth studio album released by the Canterbury scene band Caravan. Richard Sinclair and Steve Miller left the band prior to the recording of this album. They were replaced by John G. Perry and the returning Dave Sinclair. Viola player Geoff Richardson was added to the band.

Track listing 
All songs composed by Pye Hastings, except where noted.

Side one

Side two

The following bonus tracks were included on the 2001 remastered edition of the CD.

Personnel
Caravan
 Pye Hastings – electric and acoustic guitars, lead vocals
 Geoff Richardson – violin
 David Sinclair – Hammond organ, piano, electric piano, Davoli synthesizer, ARP synthesizer on (1 b)
 John G. Perry – bass, vocals, percussion
 Richard Coughlan – drums, percussion, timpani

Additional personnel
 Rupert Hine – ARP synthesizer (1a,b & 6)
 Frank Ricotti – congas ( 1 b, 2, 4, 7)
 Jimmy Hastings – flute (1)
 Pete King – flute, alto saxophone (1)
 Harry Klein – clarinet, baritone saxophone (1)
 Tony Coe – clarinet, tenor saxophone (1)
 Henry Lowther – trumpet (1)
 Chris Pyne – trombone (1)
 Barry Robinson – piccolo (1)
 Tom Whittle – clarinet, tenor saxophone (1)
 Jill Pryor – voice (4)
 Paul Buckmaster – electric cello (7)
 Orchestra arranged by John Bell and Martyn Ford, conducted by Martyn Ford

Releases
Source:

References

External links
 
 
 Caravan - For Girls Who Grow Plump in the Night (1973) album review by Lindsay Planer, credits & releases at AllMusic.com
 Caravan - For Girls Who Grow Plump in the Night (1973) album releases & credits at Discogs.com

Caravan (band) albums
1973 albums
Deram Records albums
Albums produced by Dave Hitchcock